Anand Ramlogan is a member of the Bar of Trinidad and Tobago, England & Wales and the British Virgin Islands. He is the founder and head of Freedom Law Chambers which is based in the city of San Fernando, Trinidad. He served as junior counsel to the late Sir Fenton Ramsahoye QC in whose footsteps he followed to become the Attorney General of Trinidad and Tobago during the period 28 May 2010 – 2 February 2015. As Attorney General, he was also the titular head of the bar.

Ramlogan is also a constitutional and human rights lawyer, having been called to the bar of Trinidad and Tobago in 1996 and the bar of England and Wales in 1994 and was appointed Senior Counsel on 30 December 2011. He was awarded the prestigious Express Individual of the Year award in 2004 joining a distinguished list of recipients that includes former Chief Justice Michael DeLabastide, Prime Ministers, Presidents and other prominent citizens for his outstanding work in successfully representing ordinary citizens whose rights were violated by the government.

He is a member of the Honourable Society of the Middle Temple (U.K.), the holder of an L.L.B. degree and a Master's in Corporate and Commercial Law. Ramlogan is one of the top legal minds in the Caribbean. He frequently appears in leading cases for or against the state in the superior courts including the London-based final appellate court, the Privy Council where he has done numerous appeals. In 2022 Ramlogan won a series of historic cases in the Privy Council including:

 JM v The Attorney General [2022] UKPC 54 - This case concerned a child who was tortured and sexually abused at a home for children. It was the first time in legal history that the state was found to have subjected a child to cruel and unusual punishment because of the "living hell" that was made to endure from 12 years old. The child was awarded $2 Million for the breach of his constitutional rights which included $1 Million or vindicatory damages - the largest sum ever.
 Akili Charles v The Attorney General [2022] UKPC - This landmark case challenged a law that prohibited bail for murder. In a unanimous decision, the Privy Council ruled that such a law was unconstitutional thereby paving the way for persons accused of murder to apply for bail. Thus, after persons accused of murder could not apply for bail (regardless of the circumstances) for over a century, they can now do so. Bail should only be granted in cases where the accused does not pose a threat to society.
 Akili Charles v The Attorney General [2022] UKPC 49 - The state was ordered to pay the legal costs of a re-trial because it was the author of the "colossal misstep" that affected many prisoners who had been awaiting trial for over a decade.
 A&A Mechanical v Petroleum Company of Trinidad - This was a multi-million-dollar commercial dispute which resulted in the national oil company having to pay millions of dollars to a local contractor. It is now a leading case on the law on "without prejudice" communications in the context of commercial negotiations.

Education 
He received his primary education at the Reform Presbyterian School and secondary schooling at ASJA Boys' College and Pleasantville Senior Comprehensive, in San Fernando. On completing secondary school, he entered the University of the West Indies, Cave Hill campus, Barbados, to read for his Bachelor of Laws degree where he won several prizes for academic excellence including the Mark of Merit and best all round student.

Ramlogan was awarded several post-graduate scholarships and read for his LLM (in corporate and commercial law) at the Centre for Commercial Law Studies, Queen Mary & Westfield College, University of London (now known as the Queen Mary University). Whilst at the Queen Mary & Westfield, he simultaneously pursued a post-graduate diploma in Law at the University of Westminster, courtesy the British Chevening Scholarship and the British Foreign Office Scholarship programme.

Private practice
He is an advocate who is known for his pioneering work in the field of human rights, constitutional and public law where he represents the interests of the average man against the government. He uses the instrument of the law to achieve social transformation and many of his cases have prompted significant changes in the law. He gives advice on a wide range of matters to public officials and lawyers in other Caribbean countries. He is admitted to practice in the British Virgin Islands (BVI), St Lucia and Anguilla.

His recent legal exploits include successful challenges to the appointment of Gary Griffith as Commissioner of Police, constitutional challenges to the Proceeds of Crime Act and the property tax legislation which effectively prevented the government from implementing the property tax for over 5 years.

He has appeared in over 50 Privy Council appeals and has also appeared before the Caribbean Court of Justice. Recent cases before the UK-based Judicial Committee of Her Majesty’s Privy Council (the highest court for Trinidad and Tobago) include:

 Challenging the decision to construct a highway through the Aripo Savannas Strict Nature Reserve, a unique ecosystem which was declared Environmentally Sensitive.
 Freedom of Information application against national oil company to ascertain the basis for withdrawing a multi-billion dollar lawsuit by the new government. 
 The correct composition of the Judicial & Legal Service Commission which is responsible for making judicial appointments.
 Challenging delay by the National Energy Corporation in providing information about the ethnicity of senior staff.
 Breach of the constitutional rights of children.
 Damages for breach of the right to equality of treatment.
 Unfair treatment regarding promotion in the police service.
 Denial of legal costs.

He has done numerous cases in the High Court and Court of Appeal in breach of contract, defamation, discrimination, police brutality, medical negligence, personal injuries and commercial law.

Political and journalistic activities
Mr. Ramlogan has a distinguished record in public service and has served on many committees and statutory bodies such as the Petroleum Company of Trinidad and Tobago, the Law Reform Commission, the Civil Aviation Authority, the Commission of Enquiry into the Administration of Justice and the Vision 2020 plan for Constitutional Reform.

Anand entered politics as a candidate for the Congress of the People (COP) under the leadership of Professor Winston Dookeran. He contested the seat for the constituency of Tabaquite in 2007 but subsequently re-joined the United National Congress after Kamla Persad-Bissessar was elected political leader. He was subsequently appointed a government senator and Attorney General.

Prior to his appointment as Attorney General, Ramlogan was a prominent lawyer who had become a household name for championing the legal cause of many poor and downtrodden citizens. He also won many historic cases against the People's National Movement government for persons such as former CEO of the San Fernando City Corporation Marlene Coudray, Devant Maharaj, Feroza Ramjohn, George Daniel and Damien Belfonte.

Anand was also an active member of the media, hosting a radio talk show with radio 90.5 FM, was a columnist with the leading daily newspapers, the Sunday Guardian, the Express and the Newsday newspapers for many years. His views are sought after by the media on a wide range of legal, social and political issues.

Attorney generalship
On 26 May 2010, two days after the success of the People's Partnership in the 2010 General Election, Anand Ramlogan was appointed a Senator and Attorney General by Kamla Persad-Bissessar. Under Section 75 (2) of the constitution, the Attorney General must be appointed forthwith after the prime minister in order for the Cabinet to be properly established.

In 2019, Ramlogan was charged with misconduct in public office. He maintained that he was the victim of political conspiracy. The charges were eventually discontinued by the DPP after it was discovered that millions of dollars had been secretly paid by the new PNM Government to the prosecution’s lone witness as part of an undisclosed illicit indemnity agreement.

Former independent senator and president of the law association Martin Daly SC said it was akin to bounty hunting.

References

Living people
Alumni of Queen Mary University of London
Alumni of the University of Westminster
Members of the Middle Temple
20th-century Trinidad and Tobago lawyers
University of the West Indies alumni
Members of the Senate (Trinidad and Tobago)
Attorneys General of Trinidad and Tobago
Year of birth missing (living people)
21st-century Trinidad and Tobago lawyers
Chevening Scholars